DYFM may refer to:
 DYFM-AM, an AM radio station broadcasting in Iloilo City, branded as Bombo Radyo
 DYFM-FM, an FM radio station broadcasting in Cebu City, branded as Radyo5